Qū, qú (pronunciation in Taiwan), qūniè, jiǔqū, or jiǔmǔ is a type of East Asian dried fermentation starter grown on a solid medium and used in the production of traditional Chinese alcoholic beverages. The Chinese character 曲/麹 is romanised as qū in pinyin, chhu or chu in other transcription systems. The literal translation of jiǔqū is "liquor ferment", although "liquor mold" or "liquor starter" are adequate descriptions.

The word jiǔqū specifically refers to a type of ferment (qū, 曲/麹) used to manufacture alcoholic products (jiǔ 酒),  such as huangjiu (cereal wines), baijiu (distilled spirits), and jiuniang (alcoholic rice porridge/pudding). There are other varieties of qū specific for different types of fermentations, such as in the production of jiàngyóu (酱油 soy sauce), cù (醋 vinegar), fǔrǔ (腐乳 fermented bean curd) and dòubànjiàng (豆瓣酱 fermented bean paste). Qū is the direct Chinese counterpart of the more widely known Japanese fermentation starter called koji (麹/糀), although qū predates and differs from it slightly.

Jiuqu consists of a complex mixture of various molds, yeasts, and bacteria with their associated metabolites, cultured on a starch-rich substrate in a solid state fermentation process. They are typically stored and sold in the form of dried bricks (daqu, 大曲), balls (xiaoqu, 小曲 e.g. Shanghai yeast balls), powders or as dried grains (red yeast rice, 红曲米). The most common organisms found in Jiuqu are the filamentous molds Aspergillus oryzae and Rhizopus oryzae and the amylolytic yeast Saccharomycopsis fibuligera. Amylolytic and proteolytic enzymes are the most abundant metabolites isolated.

Although the art of making jiuqu is a traditional practice in China that can be traced as far back as the Shang dynasty (17th to 11th century BC), it can be technically classified as a type of biomolecule manufacturing process. Jiuqu preparation serves two parallel functions, the growth of the microbial species and their generation of enzyme metabolites. Both are dried gradually on the substrate, ensuring their viability for anticipated reactivation when the jiuqu is added to a new source of water and nutrition. Jiuqu is therefore a source of both microbes and enzymes. The addition of jiuqu to a cereal or pulse-based solution initiates the breakdown of carbohydrates, proteins and lipids into CO2, ethanol, organic acids and various other metabolites. This complex process of simultaneous catabolism and fermentation, often termed parallel or mash fermentation, is at variance with the beer and wine processes typical of the western world.

The traditional practice of the production of jiuqu was often empirical and took place in homes, villages or small-scale manufacturing facilities, lacking the level of consistency or quality required by modern consumers. In modern times, in an effort to refine the process and drawing upon the experience of koji manufacturing development in Japan, which is highly industrialized with the use of isolated monocultures, large jiuqu companies have taken advantage of laboratory methods utilizing selected pure cultures of each organism as individual starters. Selected microorganisms isolated from traditional jiuqu practices now find widespread application in the Chinese biotechnology industry to manufacture enzymes, organic acids, ethanol, polysaccharides, amino acids and vitamins.

History

Jiuqu is also known variably across China as "starter cake", "liquor medicine" or more simply known as qu (曲/麹 approximate English pronunciation "chew"). Classified among the multitude of starter cultures used for traditional cereal or pulse-based fermentations worldwide, jiuqu in a modern context refers explicitly to types of microbes and their enzymes (qu 曲/麹) domesticated for usage in the manufacture of products containing alcohol (jiu 酒). In various other East, South and Southeast Asian nations, qu can be known as koji in Japan, nuruk in Korea, murcha/marcha in India and Nepal, banh men in Vietnam, paeng in Laos, loog pang in Thailand, mochi kouji in Myanmar, mae domba in Cambodia, ragi in Indonesia and Malaysia, and bubod in the Philippines. The process of creating qu for use in fermentation is believed to have originated in China some 3000–4000 years ago and has been introduced throughout the rest of East Asia, and into Southeast Asia and South Asia.

Jiuqu is directly referenced in the Book of Documents or Shangshu, one of the five ancient Confucian writings. In a chapter of the book from the Shang dynasty (17th to 11th century BC) it is recorded "to make wine or sweet liquor one needs qu nieh". Although the precise translation of the text is debatable, most authorities concur that qu describes a preparation of ferments, whilst nieh refers to sprouted grain. They may have formed separate elements of liquor production (both qu and nieh) or possibly might refer to a single preparation made of fermenting sprouted grains (qunieh). Shangshu is considered to predate 500 BC, thus the ancient predecessor of jiuqu may be the world's oldest recorded example of biotechnological manufacturing using a domesticated microbial community.

Qu is also mentioned in the Zhouli (circa 150 BC), a collection of texts from the Eastern Zhou dynasty, where it is described for usage in preparing fermented meat and a type of grain-meat paste (jujiang). At the Mawangdui (200 BC to 10 AD), bamboo strips found in Han Tomb Number 1 document an inventory of tomb furnishings and list two sacks of qu as part of the tombs contents. The Liji (100 AD), a collection of texts from the Eastern Han dynasty, mentions qu as one of the six requisites to make good wine. Another almanac from the Eastern Han dynasty, the Shuowen Jiezi (121 AD), records a character for qu modified to include the yellow chrysanthemum flower. This has been interpreted as referring to the distinctive yellow colour formed on qu by sporulating molds. The Shiming (151 AD) goes further to indicate several types of qu, which are interpreted as being distinguished by the source of the starch and the form of the substrate. Importantly it reveals that since the Han dynasty qu was being produced in China from mostly wheat or barley and being pressed into cakes or bricks for handling. The earliest reference to actual preparation of qu appears in the Qimin Yaoshu (544 AD) of the Northern Wei dynasty. Here the techniques employed for making nine separate kinds of qu nieh are described in detail, as are their usage in the manufacture of 37 different wines. The usage of qu in making vinegar, soy pastes and soy sauces is also documented. With the release of the Qing Yilu (965 AD), the use of a special hongqu (red starter) is recorded for the first time.

The (c. 304) Nanfang Caomu Zhuang has the earliest description of preparing a natural  "herb ferment" (cǎoqū 草麴) with rice, used to make a special wine for marriage ceremonies. "In [Nanhai, in Guangzhou] there are many fine wines, prepared not with yeast leaven but by pounding rice flour mixed with many kinds of herb leaves and soaked in the juice of [yěgé] 冶葛. The dough, as big as an egg, is left in dense bushes under the shade. After a month, it is done, and is used to mix with glutinous rice to make wine. Thus if drunk heavily, even after awakening from intoxication, the head is hot and sweaty because there are poisonous herbs in it." Yege is Gelsemium elegans or heartbreak grass, the roots of which are poisonous.

Jiuqu production

Making jiuqu involves a technique of cultivating microbes on starchy materials and is an entirely separate process that precedes the actual fermentation of grains and pulses into food or alcoholic beverages. Traditional practices vary from region to region and diverge from the standardised processes now used for modern industrially-produced jiuqu.

The major principles in manufacturing jiuqu are:

a) the preparation of cereal grains (mostly rice) or a dough made from cereal grains (wheat, barley, rice and peas)
b) inoculation with previously grown microbiota (generally 4–8% weight)
c) incubation in a warm, humid environment for a set time period to stimulate growth and metabolism of microbiota
d) subsequent drying to preserve the functional properties

They can be sold fresh or stored without significant loss of viability for up to three years.

The ingredients of the substrate used for jiuqu vary across China in accordance with regional preferences, availability and the type of qu ultimately being produced. The most common flours used in daqu are wheat and barley/peas. The preparation of hongqu involves only whole rice grains. Herbs of many kinds are also variously included into the rice doughs of many xiaoqu preparations.

Traditional methods of preparing qu have changed little since the publication of the Qimin Yaoshu (544 AD). Grains or flours are saturated with water (e.g. steaming rice or mixing flour with water to form a dough) and subsequently incubated in a warm, humid environment during a favourable time of year, typically spring or autumn. No inoculums were used, but often herbs were added to some preparations because they were noted to create beneficial qualities. In order to keep the grains or doughs relatively moist and warm, they are housed in closed straw-roofed huts and typically kept in straw baskets, stacked on wooden shelves or simply placed upon the floor. Leaves of various plants, often straw, mulberry leaves or Artemisia, were used to wrap or cover the qu to promote a beneficial condition. The presses and moulds used to shape the doughs were/are also made of wood. All of these elements unknowingly provided access to the microbes. The cakes are deemed ready when a coloured coating formed on the outside. They are then dried and stored until use. The control of moisture and temperature levels and a lack of atmospheric access was recognized as vital to making consistently good jiuqu as early as the Qimin Yaoshu.

One aspect that has changed is the method of re-culturing for a subsequent preparation. Traditionally microbes indigenous to the raw material, the process and the locale simply grew upon the grains or doughs. At some stage in history it was discovered that using small amounts (2–8% weight) of a previous successful batch to inoculate the current one gave more consistent results. The starter cultures are often handed down from generation to generation in a continuous cycle of serial re-culturing. The most important functional organisms in jiuqu have been recognized as the filamentous molds Aspergillus and Rhizopus, which only reproduce asexually through spores called conidia. So an important step in manufacturing is to allow some of the cultured substrate to mature and sporulate in order to inoculate the next batch. Most of the other microbes present are capable of vegetative budding (yeasts) or binary fission (bacteria) and propagate without any intervention.

The incubation and maturation phase of making jiuqu is a typical biomolecule manufacturing process using solid state fermentation. Yeasts and bacteria are often used in industrial submerged fermentations because they thrive at high water activity and reduced oxygen levels. Molds, however, prefer the lower water content and increased oxygen found in solid-state fermentations. The steaming of grain or making of dough for jiuqu creates a solid substrate with reduced water activity. Thus, the actual jiuqu technique passed down through history unknowingly favoured the growth and reproduction of the mold genera, organisms capable of excreting large amounts of functional enzymes onto their substrate. The jiuqu itself became a dried product carrying both microbes and their enzymes (the biomolecules). Most yeast and bacteria do not find the conditions of jiuqu optimal but still grow effectively in solid state fermentations and their relationships to jiuqu have been understudied.

Jiuqu processing can be carried out synchronously in the factory or workplace that produces the fermented end-product (such as a brewery or soy sauce factory) or it can be produced independently for sale to an establishment for a specific use. Traditionally the brewery was not responsible for making jiuqu but now often they specialize in the preparation. Jiuqu manufacturing techniques still vary widely, with each brewery or factory using a slightly different process and locally indigenous microflora, which in turn has generated a large biodiversity in jiuqu across China.

The process of making industrialized jiuqu is now inherently more complex as there are two end products sought to be manufactured by the factory, jiuqu for use in alcohol production and so called 'seed' jiuqu for continued culturing of the microbiota. Seed jiuqu is a pre-production process tailored to suit the growth and subsequent reproductive cycle of select microbes.

As such, jiuqu practices have evolved from:
1) no-inoculum, spontaneous growth of microbiota from the natural surroundings through to
2) inoculation with a previous batch to improve consistency, culminating in
3) 20th century industrial culturing of the microbiota in a special pre-production process.

A fourth step was introduced in 21st century China, where totally aseptic laboratory conditions are used to mono-culture specific favourable strains of mold, yeast and bacteria grown on independent, fortified substrates. Such isolates now find usage in biotechnology applications such as fuel ethanol or enzyme production. An important objective in Chinese industry is the continued research into biotechnological domestication of such microbes and as such, standardization of jiuqu preparation is being achieved.

Functions
The advantage of using qu for alcohol production is in its two-fold effect. The enzymes and microorganisms in qu at the same time break down the starches and sugars, reducing the process of making grain spirits to basically one step. The use of microbial-cultured starches for fermentation has a long history in East Asian countries, as seen by the diversity of foods and beverages produced. Brewing alcoholic beverages from grains typically involves the use of sprouted cereal grains that supply natural enzymes to break down carbohydrates, proteins and lipids. The ensuing liquid obtained is fermented by microbes and turned into an alcoholic drink.

As the grains used for traditional East Asian alcoholic fermentations are raw and unsprouted (unmalted), the enzymes responsible for the conversion of carbohydrates to fermentable sugars are absent and thus fermentation cannot proceed. Culturing microbes on cereal grains is a time-honoured tradition in East Asia and the necessary way around this dilemma, as they exude the enzymes that allow liquefaction and saccharification to occur (up to fifty different enzymes have been isolated from Aspergillus oryzae starters). Their mutualistic symbiosis with fermentative yeast and bacteria initiates the complex saccharification-liquefaction-fermentation process to produce the sought-after alcoholic liquid.

Jiuqu is ground and applied directly in the form of a dry powder to cooked grain at a predefined temperature suitable for the growth of the microbes. Any enzymes present in the jiuqu are rehydrated and mobilized, but in most applications only a small amount of jiuqu is used (2–8%) that precludes any major enzyme input from the starter. As such, jiuqu is only utilized to inoculate the mash with microbes. In the case of baijiu production, typical amounts of 15–25% jiuqu are used, sometimes as high as 50%, which consequently provides a major enzyme contribution to the mash to initiate catabolism. The exponential growth and reproduction of microbes after inoculation releases more enzymes in the process, inducing further catabolism of the substrate, to produce poly- and mono-saccharides, amino acids, peptides, CO2, alcohol and organic acids.

Although only one type of starter is required, many Chinese breweries use two of more types of starters for added complexity in flavour. Modern Chinese brewing has also adopted many practices to optimize production and a 'seed mash' is now commonly prepared where the jiuqu is added, often along with yeast (酵母 jiao mu or chiao mu or simply jiao/chiao 酵), to a small amount of the substrate. After incubation for 2–7 days the seed mash is then added to the bulk of fermentables.

Microbiota of jiuqu

The geographical environment exerts a significant influence on the microbiology of jiuqu. Certain species and genera prefer different climatic conditions and domestication in the jiuqu making process has favoured the development of regional microbiota assemblages across China. By comparison, the industrial Japanese koji-making process favours only one monoculture species, Aspergillus oryzae. One difficult aspect in identifying the species present in jiuqu appears to be bias introduced by the analytical technique used, i.e. culture dependent or DNA extraction methods often miss entire species or misrepresent their statistical importance. Studies published so far have failed to establish any pattern in jiuqu microbiology across China, reflecting the large amount of regional diversity.

Molds

Molds are the most prevalent organisms found in jiuqu and are considered to be the dominant enzymatic agents responsible for liberating glucose and other fermentable sugars from the source of carbohydrates used (along with the yeast Saccharomycopsis fibuligera). Molds found in traditional Chinese fermentation starters include Aspergillus, Rhizopus, Amylomyces, Monascus, Absidia, Rhizomucor, and Mucor. Species of Rhizopus are capable of producing fumaric acid, lactic acid and ethanol as they excrete zymases, but their production capabilities vary widely from strain to strain. Rhizopus oryzae and Aspergillus oryzae are the two most common molds isolated in jiuqu.

The species of mold present appears to be an important factor in determining the type of jiuqu being produced and its intended use. In turn, the dominant mold species is highly dependent on the climate, substrate and production techniques that vary across the provinces of China. Both substrate and incubation phases can be adjusted to favour the growth of certain species of molds, e.g. Rhizopus and Mucor prefer higher water activities and temperatures to Aspergillus, whilst Mucor and Actinomucor prefer substrates richer in protein. In some reported examples of jiuqu microbiology, potentially harmful strains of mold were encountered such as Aspergillus flavus and Rhizopus microsporus, but it is uncertain if they were identified correctly or if the strains encountered were in fact capable of toxin production.

Yeast

Yeast species form part of the symbiotic nature of a jiuqu starter and can be enzymatic (substrate-degrading) and/or fermentative. Yeast genera observed for jiuqu in decreasing order of significance include Saccharomycopsis, Issatchenkia, Saccharomyces, Pichia, Candida and Rhodotorula. The yeast species most frequently reported for jiuqu starters is Saccharomycopsis fibuligera, as is typical for traditional East Asian fermentation starters. A close relative, Issatchenkia orientalis, is also reported frequently and together they appear to be co-involved in starch breakdown with the mold genera. Both species have limited but capable (3–5% alcohol) fermentative capacities. Pichia anomala is almost ubiquitous and although incapable of elevated alcohol production, it appears to be vital in developing taste and aroma. Saccharomyces cerevisiae is the most common highly fermentative yeast present in jiuqu.

Bacteria

Bacterial species are present in large numbers in jiuqu and are also partly responsible for the successful breakdown of proteins and carbohydrates and the conversion of fermentable sugars into organic acids. Lactic acid is the most common organic acid found in Chinese alcoholic beverages and plays a vital role in both the organoleptic qualities, as well as acting as a naturally occurring preservative. The bacterial species most commonly found in decreasing significance include Bacillus, Lactobacillus, Leuconostoc, Streptomyces, Acetobacter and Clostridium. Of these genera Bacillus species are the dominant bacterial genera in jiuqu. Bacillus species are known to be large producers of enzymes and therefore also contribute to the overall breakdown of the cereal grains.

Types

An exponential variety of jiuqu can be produced by manipulating the ingredients and process across the different ecological environments of China. Some types are produced by exploiting natural temperature shifts, others by purely mechanical temperature adjustments. Some jiuqu are still wrapped in straw and sun dried, whilst others are wrapped in straw and hung from the rafters to dry in the wind. Although jiuqu will contain its own distinctive, region-specific mix of microorganisms, the temperature schemes involved in preparation directly manipulate the microbial ecology, e.g. Aspergillus oryzae and species of Actinomucor and Mucor prefer lower temperatures than Rhizopus oryzae. In turn the starch ingredients used also alter the microbial ecology dictating both the type and amount of metabolites present, e.g. Aspergillus oryzae and Rhizopus oryzae both produce more starch degrading enzymes and are found commonly on 100% flour substrates, whilst Actinomucor and Mucor produce more proteolytic and lipolytic enzymes and are more abundant when pulse flours are added.

The several types of jiuqu can be used specifically or in conjunction with one another for the production of Chinese alcoholic drinks. Huangjiu, or cereal wines, can incorporate one or several of the starters with the combination of xiaoqu and daqu being most common. In contrast, baijiu, a distilled beverage, generally uses only daqu.

Xiaoqu

Xiaoqu or "small starter" are generally small cubes or flattened or rounded balls made of rice dough incubated for only a short period of time, usually only several days. Rice flour or rice bran and inoculum are used, with bentonite clay as a bulking agent. Traditionally various herbs (from one to fifteen varieties) are incorporated into the preparation as either yaoqu (herb xiaoqu) or baiqu (white or herb-less xiaoqu). They are commonly referred to as Chinese or Shanghai yeast balls when available through western Chinese suppliers.

Used mostly for the production of huangjiu and jiuniang and most popular in the southern provinces of China, xiaoqu is added only to inoculate a fermentation and constitutes very little of the substrate in producing cereal wines (typically 3–8%). As such, xiaoqu contributes very minor flavour, aroma or enzymatic function when compared to daqu. Xiaoqu are the Chinese equivalent of what most other East, South and Southeast Asian countries use as a fermentation starter, e.g. banh men, bubod, murcha, ragi, nuruk.

Xiaoqu are almost always white because Rhizopus oryzae is the dominant mold species and saccharifying agent. Some types of xiaoqu are now prepared by mixing yeast sediment with the normal inoculum to produce a more fermentative starter.

Daqu

Daqu or "large starter" are large, cakes or bricks of dough that have been incubated for a long period, typically three to four or six to eight weeks, and matured for an extended period of up to six months or more. They are rarely available outside of China. Wheat flour is the main ingredient of choice in making daqu, but some specific types call for the use of barley-wheat and barley-pea flour. The four most famous baijiu of China, Maotai, Fenjiu, Luzhou Laojiao and Xifengjiu, are all made with daqu only. Some huangjiu are often started with xiaoqu and finished with daqu. Daqu can come in three colours that mostly reflect the dominant mold species present: grey-white (Rhizopus oryzae and/or R. chinensis ), yellow to yellow-green (Aspergillus oryzae) and black (Aspergillus niger and/or A. luchuensis).

Both the larger size and the longer incubation ensures higher enzyme and microbial load than xiaoqu. They are the only starter used for most baijiu liquor fermentations due to their greater starch degrading capacity, i.e. they contribute a high amount of enzymes. The greater degree of microbial metabolism because of a longer, higher temperature conversion phase of incubation is also said to provide certain organoleptic qualities that would be otherwise unachievable in the final distilled liquor. This also directly relates to the greater use of daqu as an ingredient in making baijiu rather than simply as an inoculant. Daqu typically constitutes 15–25% of the overall fermentables, whereas xiaoqu is used only to inoculate a fermentation (3–8%). The heavy use (50%) of large  bricks of daqu incubated at high temperatures is responsible for the pungent aroma and umami-like flavour of Maotai.

Daqu is the most complex process of jiuqu preparation and has undergone the most modernization. It involves the manipulation of specific time-temperature control schemes in order to achieve slightly different types of qu, which in turn are used to generate several types of liquor. The four baijiu aromas most typical of China are considered to be sauce-aroma (e.g. Maotai), strong-aroma (e.g. Luzhou Laojiao), mixed-aroma (e.g. Xifengjiu) and light-aroma (e.g. Fenjiu). Daqu preparation is manipulated in order to help produce these different aromas.

Daqu can be generally categorized into three kinds according to the highest temperature achieved during incubation: high-temperature daqu, medium-temperature daqu and low-temperature daqu respectively. As an example of the differing usages schemes, Maotai uses high-temp daqu and Luzhou Laojiao uses medium-temp daqu, and both are made from wheat flour. Fenjiu and Xifengjiu use low-temp daqu made from barley and pea flour but differ in coarseness of the crushed grains (Fenjiu coarse, Xifengjiu small).

High- and medium-temp daqu generally undergo a four-step process:
 a low-temperature incubation phase for 3–5 days to stimulate initial growth of microbes,
 a higher temperature conversion phase for 3–5 days to increase the metabolic activities of the microbes,
 a curing phase for 9–12 days to create flavours and dehydrate the cake and
 maturation for up to six months or more at ambient temperatures.

Low-temp daqu typically undergo a more complex six-step process: 
 a low temperature incubation phase for 2–4 days
 a cooling phase for 3–5 days to stabilize growth of microbes
 a heating phase for 4–5 days to increase metabolic activities
 a curing phase for 7–8 days to create flavour and further dehydrate the cake
 an equilibration phase (<) for 4–5 days to cool the cakes
 maturation for up to six months or more at ambient temperatures.

The scientific basis for the different processes which lead to different varieties of daqu and their impact needs to be further clarified, as standardization of production methods is a leading goal of the Chinese alcohol industry.

Hongqu

Hongqu or "red starter", also called angkak in Hokkien, is rice that had been cultured primarily with Monascus purpureus or other red rice molds of the genus Monascus, available as dried, mold-encrusted rice with a unique red colour, and sold as "red yeast rice" (红曲米/红麹米). Used mostly for huangjiu and rice vinegar (cu) this starter gives the beverage a unique red or purple colour due to pigments that are produced by members of Monascus. Gutian Hong Qu is the name for this famous fermentation starter, inoculated with a "seed" culture called Qu Mu, containing only Monascus species. A popular alternative variety also used is Wuyi Hong Qu, that involves seeding the rice with both Qu Mu as above and Qu Qing, a "seed" culture that contains a black mold (Aspergillus niger and/or A. luchuensis) to make the rice black outside/red inside. A rarer variety is called Huangyi Hong Qu that involves Monascus with a yellow mold (Aspergillus oryzae or A. flavus) to make the rice yellow outside/red inside.

Hongqu is prepared in a very similar way to Japanese koji: rice is steamed, cooled and then mixed with the inoculum (1–2%). A modern practice is to steep the rice in weak acetic acid solution for a short period to help create the optimum pH of 3–3.5 that favours Monascus growth. Afterward incubation the rice is removed and dried.

Often in the production of Hongqu rice wine, both hongqu and xiaoqu are utilized. Studies have revealed that Monascus species show strong gluco-amylase activity, but poor proteolytic and lipolytic enzyme production. Also the fermentative yeast Saccharomyces cerevisiae was mostly absent from hongqu starters but present in xiaoqu. Thus hongqu is used only to provide red pigmentation and saccharification and as such, should generally be used in conjunction with another starter with high fermentative capability.

Minor varieties

The following fall under the fourth major category of Chinese Qu, Mai Qu (麦曲), a fermentation starter utilizing wheat only. It is used as a major component (15–25%) of the total starter for some huangjiu. The manufacturing process and microbiota are similar to Daqu but it is made entirely from wheat.

Shenqu (神曲): Made of raw, roasted and steamed wheat
Fuqu (麸曲): Wheat bran
Shumaiqu (熟麦曲): Steamed wheat
Benqu (笨曲): Roasted wheat
Sengmaiqu (生麦曲): Raw wheat

See also
Agkud
Awamori
Chinese wine

References

Chinese alcoholic drinks
Rice wine